Whirlwind Horseman is a 1938 American Western film directed by Robert F. Hill and written by George H. Plympton. The film stars Ken Maynard, Joan Barclay, Billy Griffith, Kenneth Harlan, Joseph W. Girard and Kenny Dix. The film was released on April 29, 1938, by Grand National Films Inc.

Plot

Cast          
Ken Maynard as Ken Morton
Joan Barclay as Peggy Radford
Billy Griffith as Happy Holmes
Kenneth Harlan as John Harper
Joseph W. Girard as Jim Radford 
Kenny Dix as Lonesome
Glenn Strange as Bull 
Roger Williams as Ritter 
Dave O'Brien as Slade 
Walter Shumway as Sheriff Blake 
Budd Buster as Cherokee Jake 
Lew Meehan as Hank
Tarzan as Tarzan

References

External links
 

1938 films
1930s English-language films
American Western (genre) films
1938 Western (genre) films
Grand National Films films
Films directed by Robert F. Hill
American black-and-white films
Films with screenplays by George H. Plympton
1930s American films